This page lists chronologically the first achievements in cinema. The development of cinema is characterised by technological breakthroughs, from early experiments in the recording of day-to-day activity, experiments in colour, different formats and sound. From the 1970s, the development of computer-generated imagery became integral to the way that films are produced.

In parallel with the developments in technology, its content and the way it reflects society and its concerns and the way society responds to it have changed too. The list attempts to address some of these events.

19th century

Pre-1870

1824
Peter Mark Roget's wrote the article Explanation of an optical deception in the appearance of the spokes of a wheel when seen through vertical apertures which described a stroboscopic illusion.

1832
Almost simultaneously, around December 1832, the Belgian physicist Joseph Plateau and the Austrian professor of practical geometry Simon Stampfer invented the Phenakistiscope, the first practical device to create a fluid illusion of motion. Plateau introduced the device in January 1833 in a scientific magazine.

1870s

1874 

 French astronomer P.J.C. Janssen came up with the idea for a "revolver photographic". This huge camera system used a Maltese cross-type mechanism, very similar to the system that would later be of great importance in the development of movie cameras. Janssen successfully captured two transits of Venus, the one of 1874 in Japan, and that of 1882 at Oran, in Algeria. Discs with test footage of a simulation from 1874 have been preserved and a modern animated version is sometimes regarded as the first movie.

1878
Using a battery of 12 cameras Eadweard Muybridge records several series of The Horse in Motion, capturing successive phases of movements that allowed his patron Leland Stanford to study the positions of the legs of his race horses during different gaits. The technique would soon be dubbed chronophotography.

1880s

1880
 During his lectures on locomotion, Eadweard Muybridge projected looping animations of The Horse in Motion with his Zoopraxiscope. The stroboscopic apparatus used glass discs on which silhouette versions of the photographs had been traced by an artist (with anamorphic corrections for the distortion caused by fast rotation).

1882
Étienne-Jules Marey developed the Chronophotographe, which could take 12 pictures per second from a single viewpoint.

1888
In Leeds, England Louis Le Prince films Roundhay Garden Scene, believed to be the first motion picture recorded.

1890s

1889 or 1890
Monkeyshines, by William Kennedy Dickson and William Heise. Believed to be the first film shot in the United States. An experimental film made to test the original cylinder Kinetograph format.

1891
Dickson Greeting, by William Kennedy Dickson was the first semi-public demonstration of cinematographic pictures in the United States. The National Federation of Women's Clubs were shown a 3 second clip of Dickson passing a hat in front of himself, and reaching for it with his other hand on May 20, 1891 at Edison's laboratory.

1892
On 28 October 1892 Charles-Émile Reynaud gave the first public performance of a moving picture show at the Musée Grévin in Paris, the Théâtre Optique. The show, billed as Pantomimes Lumineuses, included three cartoons, Pauvre Pierrot, Un bon bock, and Le Clown et ses chiens, each consisting of 500 to 600 individually painted images and lasting about 15 minutes. The film was the first to use perforations.

1893
Blacksmith Scene, by William Kennedy Dickson. The first Kinetoscope film shown in public exhibition on May 9, 1893 and is the earliest known example of actors performing a role in a film.
The world's first film production studio, the Black Maria, or the Kinetographic Theater, was completed on the grounds of Edison's laboratories at West Orange, New Jersey, for the purpose of making film strips for the Kinetoscope. Construction began in December 1892.

1894
 On April 14, 1894, a public Kinetoscope parlor was opened by the Holland Bros. in New York City at 1155 Broadway, on the corner of 27th Street—the first commercial motion picture house. The venue had ten machines, set up in parallel rows of five, each showing a different movie. For 25 cents a viewer could see all the films in either row; half a dollar gave access to the entire bill.
The Dolorita Passion Dance was banned in New Jersey after its use in peepshows. Russell Kick quotes the work Censorship as saying it "was probably the first [film] to be banned in the United States."
La Sortie des Usines, the first film to be made in France.
The Dickson Experimental Sound Film by William Kennedy Dickson.  It is the first known film with live-recorded sound and appears to be the first motion picture made for the Kinetophone, the proto-sound-film system developed by Dickson and Thomas Edison.

1895
First hand-colored film, Annabelle Serpentine Dance by William Kennedy Dickson.
Charles Francis Jenkins displays the Phantascope, the first patented Film projector.
Incident at Clovelly Cottage by Robert W. Paul and Birt Acres is the first film to be made in the United Kingdom.
L'Arroseur Arrosé, the first comedy film.
The Execution of Mary Stuart, the first use of a special effect in a movie.
History of the Kinetograph, Kinetoscope, and Kinetophonograph by Antonia and William Kennedy Dickson, considered the first book of history on film, is published.

1896
The first building dedicated exclusively to showing motion pictures was the Vitascope Hall, established on Canal Street, New Orleans, Louisiana, on June 26 — it was converted from a vacant store.
Later that year on October 19, the Edisonia Hall opened in Buffalo, New York in the Ellicott Square Building. The Edisonia was the first known dedicated, purpose-built motion picture theater in the world.
Alice Guy-Blaché, the first female film director makes La Fée aux Choux (The Cabbage Fairy) acknowledged as the first narrative fiction film. This movie also introduces screenplays for the first time. 
In The Kiss, May Irwin and John Rice re-enact the kiss from the New York stage hit The Widow Jones, the first film of a couple kissing.
 The House of the Devil, the first horror film.
 Le Coucher de la Mariée, a French erotic short film considered to be one of the first erotic films made. The film was first screened in Paris in November 1896, within a year of the first public screening of a projected motion picture.

1898
 Walking Troubles of Organic Hemiplegy was the first documentary film in the world, created by Romanian neurologist Gheorghe Marinescu. The film depicts several patients affected by debilitating neurological diseases walking before and after treatment.

1899
The first example of object manipulation and stop-motion animation was the short film by Albert E. Smith and J. Stuart Blackton called The Humpty Dumpty Circus.
King John is the first film adaptation of the work of William Shakespeare. The film features Herbert Beerbohm Tree in the title role and features the death scene from King John.

20th century

1900s

1901
Histoire d'un crime, directed by Ferdinand Zecca was the first film to use flashbacks to create a non-linear narrative.
The earliest known use of intertitles was in the British film Scrooge, or, Marley's Ghost.
A Nymph of the Waves, the first experimental film.

1902
Edward Raymond Turner's children and several other very short test films, the earliest known moving pictures photographed in color.
A Trip to the Moon is the first sci-fi movie, as well as the first film to feature an extraterrestrial.

1903
The Great Train Robbery, directed by Edwin S. Porter was the first western film.

1904
The Great Train Robbery, directed by Siegmund Lubin was the first film remake.

1906
Humorous Phases of Funny Faces directed by J. Stuart Blackton is the first animated film recorded on standard picture film.
The Story of the Kelly Gang by Charles Tait is the first feature film to be released.

1907
January 19, Variety publishes reviews of two films, An Exciting Honeymoon and The Life of a Cowboy by Edwin S. Porter. These are believed to be the first film reviews published.
L'Enfant prodigue is the first feature film produced in Europe.

1908
A Visit to the Seaside is the first film to use Kinemacolor.
The Assassination of the Duke of Guise is the first film to have a score specifically written for it, by French composer Camille Saint-Saëns.
Fantasmagorie is considered the first animated cartoon

1909
The first full length feature film produced in the United States was an adaptation of Victor Hugo's novel Les Misérables.
Wilbur Wright und seine Flugmaschine was the first film shot from an aeroplane took place in April 1909. Wilbur Wright was training military personnel and took a newsreel cameraman on a flight in Rome to record this.
Albert Samama Chikly took the first underwater shot.

1910s

1910
 The German film serial, Arsène Lupin contra Sherlock Holmes  directed by Viggo Larsen was the first film crossover.
 For the first time, the rights to adapt a novel are bought from a publisher, (Little, Brown & Company who published Helen Hunt Jackson's novel Ramona.) The film is made by D. W. Griffith.
 D. W. Griffith makes In Old California, the first film to be made in Hollywood.

1912
With Our King and Queen Through India, a documentary recording Indian celebrations around the coronation of George V, is the first feature film to be released in colour, using the Kinemacolour system.

1914

 Lois Weber directs The Merchant of Venice making her the first American female director of a feature length film.

1915
The Birth of a Nation, directed by D. W. Griffith was the first big budget Hollywood epic.

1916
The Fall of a Nation, directed by Thomas Dixon Jr. was the first film sequel.
20,000 Leagues Under the Sea is the first feature-length film adaptation of a Jules Verne work. Since its release, at least 56 subsequent feature-length adaptations have been made as of 2022.
A Daughter of the Gods is the first film with a budget greater than $1,000,000.

1917
The first animated feature film was El Apóstol by Quirino Cristiani from Argentina.
The Gulf Between directed by Wray Physioc is the first feature film to use Technicolor.

1918
Men Who Have Made Love to Me, directed by Arthur Berthelet was the first film to break the fourth wall.

1920s

1920
The Cabinet of Dr. Caligari, the first movie to have a twist ending.

1921
A Connecticut Yankee in King Arthur's Court (1921), directed by Emmett J. Flynn was the first film to feature time travel to the past.

1922
On October 18, the first-ever Hollywood premiere was held at Grauman's Egyptian Theatre, for the release of Robin Hood.
The first colour feature film made in Hollywood, The Toll of the Sea, starring Anna May Wong.
First feature film in 3D. The Power of Love by Nat Deverich, which premiered at the Ambassador Hotel Theater in Los Angeles on September 27.
Foolish Wives becomes the first film to cost $1 million to produce. The studio took advantage of its exorbitant price and advertised it as "The First Real Million Dollar Picture".

1923
16 mm film is introduced by Eastman Kodak in the United States.

1925
The Big Parade, the first movie to swear.

1926
Don Juan becomes the first sound film, using the Vitaphone sound-on-disc system, though it contains no spoken dialogue.

1927
The Jazz Singer starring Al Jolson is the first feature film with recorded dialogue, using the Vitaphone system.
Napoleon by Abel Gance is the first film to be filmed in the widescreen format.

1928
Lights of New York, directed by Bryan Foy is the first all talking feature film.
Wings, directed by William A. Wellman is the first film to win the Academy Award for Best Picture.
The Viking is the first feature-length film in color with sound (music and sound effects only).
Steamboat Willie,  the first cartoon with synchronized sound and the first cartoon to feature a fully post-produced soundtrack.
In Old Arizona,  the first major Western to use the new technology of sound and the first talkie to be filmed outdoors.
The Air Circus becomes the first aviation oriented film with dialogue as well as the first film to depict the barnstormer era.

1929
The First Academy Award ceremony takes place at the Hollywood Roosevelt Hotel, Los Angeles on May 1. Sunrise: A Song of Two Humans wins the award for "Unique and Artistic Production" (denoting artistic strength) and Wings wins the award for "Outstanding Picture, Production" (denoting technical production quality). Both awards were eliminated and merged the next year into the single Best Picture category. Emil Jannings and Janet Gaynor won the awards for best actor and actress, which were awarded for work in a number of different films throughout the year. Acting categories were later narrowed to honor work on a single film.
Blackmail, directed by Alfred Hitchcock was the first British sound film.
The Broadway Melody, first ever musical film. Also the first sound film and first musical to win the Academy Award for Best Picture.
Happy Days is the first feature film to be shown entirely in widescreen anywhere in the world. It was filmed using the Fox Grandeur 70 mm process.
Glorifying the American Girl, the first film with sound to swear.

1930s

1930
Fiddlesticks, directed by Ub Iwerks was the first complete sound cartoon to be shot in two-strip Technicolor.
 Elstree Calling directed by Alfred Hitchcock was the first film to show a television set.
Shadows of Glory becomes the first film foreign-language sound film to be produced in the United States.
Morocco becomes the first film to feature two women sharing a kiss on screen. The women were Marlene Dietrich and an uncredited actress.

1931
Peludópolis, directed by Qirino Christiani is the first animated feature with sound.

1932
The first animated film to use the full, three-color Technicolor method was Flowers and Trees made by Disney Studios. The film was also the first to win the Academy Award for Best Animated Short Film.
Love Me Tonight by Rouben Mamoulian is credited as the first film to use a zoom lens.
The Venice Film Festival runs from 6–21 August, the first film festival.
White Zombie directed by Victor Halperin was the first zombie film.

1933
 The Crooked Circle was the first film to be broadcast on television, on March 10 in Los Angeles.
Morgenrot was the first film to have its screening in Nazi Germany, and thus the first film of Nazi Cinema. Released three days after Adolf Hitler became Reichskanzler, the film became a symbol of the new times touted by the Nazi regime.

1935
Becky Sharp, starring Miriam Hopkins, was the first feature-length film in three-strip Technicolor.

1937
Disney's Snow White and the Seven Dwarfs was the first full-length cel-animated and Technicolor feature film.

1940s

1940
First African American to be nominated and to win the Academy Award for Best Supporting Actress: Hattie McDaniel (Gone with the Wind, 1939).
Walt Disney's Fantasia is the first film with surround sound, using Disney's Fantasound system.

1943
First twins to win the Academy Award for Best Adapted Screenplay: Julius and Philip Epstein, (Casablanca, 1942).

1944
First film to feature a live action and animated character on screen at the same time: The Three Caballeros.

1946
The first Cannes Film Festival takes place from September 20 to October 5.

1947
First feature film in 3D and partly in color: Robinson Crusoe by Alexander Andreyevsky.
First feature film shot (almost) entirely from the POV of the main character: Lady in the Lake

1948
First African-American man to receive an Academy Award: James Baskett (Academy Honorary Award for his portrayal of "Uncle Remus" in Song of the South, 1946) (See also: Sidney Poitier, 1964)
The first British Academy Film Awards ceremony takes place with The Best Years of Our Lives, winning the award for best film.

1950s

1951
Distant Drums is the first film to use the Wilhelm scream.
At the 23rd Academy Awards, George Sanders becomes the first actor to win an Oscar for portraying an LGBT character, when he wins for his performance as Addison DeWitt in All About Eve.

1953
The Robe is the first film to be released in CinemaScope.

1954
Sesto Continente, directed by Folco Quilici, was the first full-length, full-color underwater documentary. The much more famous The Silent World, released in 1956, is frequently erroneously claimed as such.

1955
Disney's Lady and the Tramp is the first feature-length animated film to be released in a widescreen format, after it is released in CinemaScope. This was after Disney released the Academy Award-winning short film, Toot, Whistle, Plunk and Boom, in the same format two years prior.
A Generation is the first film to use a squib.

1956
Forbidden Planet is the first science fiction film to depict humans traveling in a faster-than-light starship of their own creation, the first to be set entirely on another planet in interstellar space, far away from Earth, as well as the first film to use an entirely electronic musical score, which was courtesy of Bebe and Louis Barron.

1958
The White Snake Enchantress is the first feature-length anime film to be made in color.

1960s

1960
Psycho is the first film to show a flushing toilet.

1962
The Manchurian Candidate was the first Hollywood film to cast a black actor in a role not specifically written as black.
Mutiny on the Bounty was the first motion picture filmed in the Ultra Panavision 70 widescreen process.

1963
The Cardinal was the first film to be shown in 70mm despite being filmed on 35mm filmstock. However, there is some disagreement over whether Taras Bulba, which was released a year prior, was shown using this process before the premiere of The Cardinal.

1964
First movie with African-American interracial marriage: One Potato, Two Potato, actors Bernie Hamilton and Barbara Barrie, written by Orville H. Hampton, Raphael Hayes, directed by Larry Peerce
First African-American man to win the Academy Award for Best Actor: Sidney Poitier (Lilies of the Field, 1963) (See also: James Baskett, 1948)

1965
Harlow (Magna film) : first feature film shot on video at the lower range of modern high definition. It used Electronovision, an american film production process based on french 819 lines TV system, which could display 737 active lines on screen, so slightly above 720p (albeit as a B&W, interlaced, 4/3 format). Videotape was transferred to 35 mm film for distribution.

1969
The Learning Tree was the first film directed by an African-American person for a major American film studio, in this case Warner Bros.-Seven Arts.

1970s

1970
Tiger Child, the first film in the IMAX format is made. Directed by Donald Brittain and produced by Roman Kroitor and Kichi Ichikawa, it premiered at Expo '70 in Osaka, Japan at the Fuji Group Pavilion.
Midnight Cowboy wins the Oscar for Best Picture, making it the only X Rated movie to win the award.

1971
The first permanent shush theatre, Cinesphere is built on the grounds of Ontario Place in Toronto, Ontario, Canada.

1972
A Computer Animated Hand, the first movie that used some advanced CGI techniques.
Cheongchun gyosa, the first movie commercially released on VHS.
Fritz the Cat, the first animated feature to be given an X rating.

1973
First use of 2D computer animation in a significant entertainment feature film, Westworld. The point of view of Yul Brynner's gunslinger was achieved with raster graphics.

1974
The Man with the Golden Gun becomes the first film to feature an "astro-spiral" jump, in which a car drives up a corkscrewed ramp and turns 360 degrees along its long axis. The stunt was performed with a AMC Hornet X hatchback by Loren "Bumps" Willert, and was done across a river near Bangkok, Thailand.

1975
Jaws becomes the first film to gross more than $400 million at the box office.
Lisztomania becomes the first movie to use the new Dolby Stereo sound system.
Barry Lyndon was the first film with scenes shot entirely by natural candlelight.

1976
Steadicam is used for the first time in a production: Hal Ashby's Bound for Glory, however, John Schlesinger's Marathon Man, released the same year is the first to be commercially released.

1978
Superman: The Movie is the first film with a computer-generated title sequence.
Watership Down is the first animated film to be presented in Dolby Stereo.

1980

1980
The Shining by Stanley Kubrick is the first film to use a steadicam in "low mode".

1981
Looker is the first film to feature a CGI human character, Cindy. Also, first use of 3D shaded CGI.

1982
For Star Trek II: The Wrath of Khan, ILM computer graphics division develops "Genesis Effect", the first use of fractal-generated landscape in a film. Bill Reeves leads the Genesis Effect programming team, and creates a new graphics technique called Particle Systems.

1983
Rock & Rule is the first animated film to use computer graphics.
The Terry Fox Story was the first television film ever made for a cable network.

1984
The Last Starfighter uses CGI for all spaceship shots, replacing traditional models. First use of 'integrated CGI' where the effects are supposed to represent real world objects.
The Sensorium is regarded the world's first 4D film.
Invasion of the Body Snatchers becomes the first film to receive a home video release in its original aspect ratio, when The Criterion Collection releases it as Laserdisc Spine #008. The practice would go onto to become the industry-wide standard for future home video releases.

1985
In Young Sherlock Holmes, Lucasfilm creates the first photorealistic CGI character, 'stained glass knight' with 10 seconds of screentime.

1986
At the Canada Pavilion in Expo 86, Vancouver, Canada the first showing of 3D Imax takes place (Transition).

1987
 Julia and Julia (Giulia e Giulia) : first feature film shot in analog HDTV with a resolution in the 1000+ lines range (japanese 1125 lines Hi-Vision system, with 1035 active lines). Transferred to 35 mm for distribution.

1988
Tin Toy by John Lasseter becomes the first computer-animated short film to win an Academy Award.

1990s

1990
The Rescuers Down Under is both Disney's first theatrical sequel and Hollywood's first feature film digitally colored and assembled entirely on computers, using the studio's proprietary "Computer Animation Production System" (CAPS).

1991
Beauty and the Beast is the first animated film to have an Academy Award nomination for Best Picture.

1992
Batman Returns is the first film to be released with Dolby SR-D technology (later known as Dolby Digital). This came after a limited experimental release of Star Trek VI: The Undiscovered Country played in three US theatres in 1991.

1993
Wax or the Discovery of Television Among the Bees, originally released in 1991, is the first film to be streamed on the Internet.
 Du fond du coeur first feature film to be shot on european 1250 lines (1152 active) HDTV format, at least partially, due to technical problems during shooting. Du fond du coeur (1994) was more successful in this regard, but, though finalized on 35 mm film, was intended as a TV serie rather than for theatrical release.

1994
True Lies by James Cameron is the first film to cost $100 million. Later, such budgets would become much more commonplace. As of January 2022, at least 448 films have been made with a budget of $100 million or more.

1995
Toy Story by John Lasseter is the first feature film to be made entirely using CGI.
Casper, the first CGI lead character in feature-length film (preceded Toy Story by six months).
Party Girl is the first film to premiere on the internet on June 3, 1995.
The LaserDisc version of Clear and Present Danger featured the first home theater Dolby Digital mix. It was quickly followed by True Lies, Stargate, Forrest Gump, and Interview with the Vampire among others.

1996
The Hunchback of Notre Dame is the first animated film to cost at least $100 million.
The English Patient is the first digitally edited film to win the Academy Award for Best Editing.

1997
Titanic by James Cameron becomes the first film to cost $200 million and to earn more than $2 billion worldwide.
Twister by Jan de Bont, the first film to be commercially available on the DVD format.

21st century

2000s

2000
 First digital cinema projection in Europe by Philippe Binant with DLP CINEMA technology for the release of Toy Story 2.
O Brother, Where Art Thou? by the Coen brothers is the first feature film to be entirely color corrected by digital means.
Fantasia 2000 is the first animated feature-length film shown in IMAX. The success of the release, as well as IMAX corporation's struggle with layoffs and closures, led to the creation of IMAX's DMR process, which up-converts conventional films to IMAX format.
Our Lady of the Assassins (film) was shot on progressive digital HDTV, though at a 30 fps framerate. Transferred to 35 mm for release.

2001
Final Fantasy: The Spirits Within is the first feature film to use motion capture to create characters.
Shrek was the first feature film to win an Academy Award for Best Animated Feature.
Spirited Away was the first anime to win an Academy Award (Academy Award for Best Animated Feature). It is also the first hand drawn and foreign film to win in the category.
Vidocq (2001 film): first film shot in digital progressive HDTV at standard 24 fps cinematic framerate

2002
Russian Ark by Alexander Sokurov is the first feature film to be shot entirely in uncompressed high definition video. It is also the first feature film to consist of a single unedited take.
The Collingswood Story is the first screenlife film
Apollo 13 is the first film to undergo IMAX's DMR process, which up-converts conventional films to IMAX format.
 Star Wars: Episode II – Attack of the Clones is the first Hollywood blockbuster shot primarily on digital video

2003
The Matrix Revolutions is the first film to be released in IMAX on the same day as its conventional film release, after undergoing their proprietary DMR process.

2004
Able Edwards, the first movie with all-CGI backgrounds and live actors.
The Polar Express by Robert Zemeckis, the first film to entirely use the performance capture technique, whereby the physical movements of the actors are digitally recorded and then translated into a computer animation.

2007
The original 65 mm negative of Baraka is scanned in 8K resolution, becoming the first film to do so.

2008
U2 3D was the first live-action film to be shot, posted, and exhibited entirely in 3D, the first live-action digital 3D film, and the first 3D concert film. Regarding its production, it was the first 3D film shot using a zoom lens, an aerial camera, and a multiple-camera setup.  Additionally, it was the first 3D film to feature composite images with more than two layers, and the first to be edited specifically to prevent the viewer from experiencing motion sickness or eye strain.
The Dark Knight is the first mainstream feature to be partially shot with IMAX 70mm cameras, with 28 minutes of footage.

2009
Monsters vs. Aliens by Conrad Vernon and Rob Letterman, the first animated film to be directly produced in the stereoscopic 3D format instead of being converted into 3D after completion.
Priyanka Chopra becomes the first actor to portray at least twelve characters in a film, when she stars in What's Your Raashee?.
 Slumdog Millionaire is the first Academy Award for Best Cinematography winner shot mainly on digital video.

2010s

2010
Avatar by James Cameron is the first 3-D film to be the highest grossing film of all time, surpassing the 2D ones.. It is also the first winner of the Academy Award for Best Cinematography shot entirely on digital video.
Toy Story 3 is the first animated film to cost at least $200 million. It's also the first animated film to gross over a $1 billion.

2011
The Artist is the first film financed entirely outside the United States and United Kingdom to win the Academy Award for Best Picture.
Searching For Sonny is the first feature film shot entirely on a DSLR.
Olive is the first feature film shot entirely on a cellphone.

2012
The Hobbit: An Unexpected Journey is the first wide-release film to be shot using a high frame rate. Cinematographer Andrew Lesnie shot the film using 48 frames per second, twice the usual 24 frames per second. However, few cinemas were capable of showing the high frame rate version of the film - at most 1,000 screens out of the 39,056 showing it in the United States - and most showed it in the ordinary frame rate. The reason for this increased frame rate was to make the 3D easier to watch, as well as remove camera blur, and increase clarity.
Brave is the first film to make use of the Dolby Atmos sound format.
Frankenweenie becomes the first black-and-white film and the first stop-motion animated film to be released in IMAX.

2013
Skyfall is the first film to gross over £100 million in the United Kingdom.
The Wolf of Wall Street by Martin Scorsese, becomes the first major American movie to be delivered to theaters in digital formats only.
Stalingrad is the first Russian film to be released in IMAX.

2014
The Hobbit: The Battle of the Five Armies is the first mainstream feature to be released in IMAX with Laser.

2016
On 14 February, the first films are released on the Ultra HD Blu-ray format, with The Amazing Spider-Man 2, Salt, Hancock, Chappie, Pineapple Express, and The Smurfs 2 being the first to be released, among others.

2017
Guardians of the Galaxy Vol. 2 is the first film to be shot in 8k resolution. It was shot with the Red Weapon 8k camera.

2018
Avengers: Infinity War is the first Hollywood feature film to be entirely shot with Arri Alexa IMAX cameras equipped with Panavision Sphero 65 & Ultra Panavision 70 lenses.

2019
The Lion King by Jon Favreau, the first photorealistic animated film.
Parasite by Bong Joon-ho, the first film not in the English language to win Academy Award for Best Picture.

2020s

2020
Nomadland by Chloé Zhao, the first Oscar Best Picture winning film to be released theatrically, direct-to-streaming and VOD at the same time.

2021
The Suicide Squad is the first non-Marvel Studios film ever released to be shot entirely with IMAX-certified digital cameras. Although Top Gun: Maverick and Dune had both accomplished the same feat and had finished filming earlier, The Suicide Squad was released first, on August 5, after the releases of the other two were delayed due to the COVID-19 pandemic. The film was shot with the Red Ranger Monstro 8K & Komodo 6K cameras. The film was also the first feature film to use the Red Komodo camera.
The Tomorrow War is the first streaming original film to cost at least $200 million to produce. The film was originally set for theatrical release by Paramount Pictures, but the film's distribution rights were ultimately acquired by Amazon due to the COVID-19 pandemic, Four months later, Red Notice was also released under similar circumstances and cost, on Netflix. As of early 2022, The Gray Man is set become the first streaming original to cost at least $200 million that was originally intended as a streaming original, once it releases in July 2022.

2023
Oppenheimer, the upcoming film from Christopher Nolan, is set to become the first film to shoot sections in IMAX black and white analog photography upon its release.

See also
History of film technology
List of directorial debuts
Timeline of computer animation in film and television

References 

 Netzley, Patricia D. Encyclopedia of Movie Special Effects. Checkmark Books, 2001.

History of film
Cinema